Riessersee is a German lake located in southwest Garmisch-Partenkirchen. The lake itself hosted the speed skating events and 10 of the 37 ice hockey games for the 1936 Winter Olympics. Adjacent to the lake, the bobsleigh events took place.

Bobsleigh track
Costing  to complete, the track was used for the 1936 Games. Having seven different seating locations, the track could seat 17,940 and the events were sold out during competition. The track was demolished in 1966. Remnants of the track can be seen on sleigh rides near the lake.

No turn names are given for the track.

Besides the 1936 Winter Games, it also hosted the FIBT World Championships in 1934 (four-man), 1938 (four-man), 1953, and 1962.

References

Venues of the 1936 Winter Olympics
Bobsleigh, luge, and skeleton tracks
Olympic bobsleigh venues
Olympic ice hockey venues
Olympic speed skating venues
Defunct sports venues in Germany
Garmisch-Partenkirchen (district)
Lakes of Bavaria
Mountain lakes
Speed skating venues in Germany